Gouraud may refer to:
 François Fauvel Gouraud (1808–1847), French expert on daguerreotypes
 George Edward Gouraud (1842–1912), American phonograph recording pioneer
 Henri Gouraud (general) (1867–1946), French World War I general
 Aimee Gouraud, better known as Aimée Crocker (1864–1941) American heiress and adventuress
 Violette Gouraud-Morris (1893–1944), French athlete
 Henri Gouraud (computer scientist) (born 1944) from France, nephew of the general

See also
 Gouraud shading, a shading algorithm invented by the computer scientist Henri Gouraud 
 Fort Gouraud
 Rue Gouraud in Lebanon